Murray Islands is a group of small islands  southeast of Cape Whitson, off the south coast of Laurie Island in the South Orkney Islands. Discovered in 1823 by Matthew Brisbane, who explored the south coast of Laurie Island under the direction of James Weddell. The name "Murrys Islands" appears on Weddell's chart, but the islands are probably named for James Murray of London, maker of the chronometers used on Weddell's voyage.

See also 
 List of Antarctic and subantarctic islands

References

Islands of the South Orkney Islands